Infanta Cristina (Cristina Federica Victoria Antonia de la Santísima Trinidad de Borbón y de Grecia, born 13 June 1965) is the younger daughter of King Juan Carlos I and his wife, Queen Sofía. She is sixth in the line of succession to the Spanish throne, after her brother King Felipe VI's children, her sister Elena, and Elena's children.

From 2013 she was investigated and later tried for fraud and acquitted of corruption involving a company owned by Cristina and her husband. Despite the acquittal, she was nonetheless stripped of her title of Duchess of Palma de Mallorca by her brother King Felipe VI as a result of the case.

Early life
Cristina de Borbón was born on 13 June 1965 at Our Lady of Loreto Hospital, now known as ORPEA Madrid Loreto in Madrid and was baptized into the Church at the Palacio de La Zarzuela by the Archbishop of Madrid. Her godparents were Alfonso, Duke of Anjou and Cádiz (her first cousin once removed), and Infanta Maria Cristina of Spain (great-aunt).

She is a sailor, and competed in the Tornado event at the 1988 Summer Olympics.

She received her secondary education at Santa María del Camino School before graduating from the Universidad Complutense de Madrid in 1989 with a degree in political science. She pursued postgraduate studies at New York University, obtaining an MA in international relations in 1990. In 1991, she gained practical experience working at the UNESCO headquarters in Paris.

She speaks Spanish, Catalan, English, French, and Greek.

Marriage and children
Cristina married team handball player Iñaki Urdangarin at Barcelona Cathedral on 4 October 1997. On this occasion, she was endowed as Duchess of Palma de Mallorca for life. The couple have four children, all born at Teknon Medical Centre in Barcelona: 
 Juan Valentín Urdangarin y Borbón (born 29 September 1999), 
 Pablo Nicolás Sebastián Urdangarin y de Borbón (born 6 December 2000), 
 Miguel Urdangarin y Borbón (born 30 April 2002), 
 Irene Urdangarin y Borbón (born 5 June 2005).

They lived in Washington, D.C. from 2009 to 2012, where her husband worked for Telefónica. In August 2013, she moved with her four children to Geneva, Switzerland, to take a job with the Caixa Foundation, while her husband, who was the subject of an embezzlement investigation, remained in Barcelona. On 24 January 2022, Cristina and Urdangarin announced their separation.

Corruption inquiry
Her husband was investigated from early 2012 on suspicion of fraudulently obtaining millions in public funds in the Nóos case. In April 2013, Infanta Cristina was formally named as a suspect in the case by the judge in charge. When invited to comment, a Royal Household spokesman said that the Casa Real "does not comment on judicial decisions", yet the next day, after the anti-corruption prosecutor announced that he would appeal the decision, it relented by expressing "absolute conformity" with the legal authorities. In light of the forthcoming trial, she and her children moved to Geneva, Switzerland, in summer 2013. On 7 January 2014, a Spanish judge charged her with tax fraud and money laundering and ordered her to appear in court. The infanta made her first appearance in the Majorca Court on 8 February 2014, where she denied any knowledge of her husband's dealings.

Spanish judge Jose Castro formalised charges against Infanta Cristina on 25 June 2014. In November 2014 the High Court of Palma de Mallorca upheld tax fraud charges against the princess, paving the way for her to face trial; however, it decided to drop money-laundering charges. Her lawyers maintained that they remained completely convinced of her innocence. On 22 December 2014 the High Court of the Balearic Islands announced that Infanta Cristina, her husband, and 15 others would stand trial on tax fraud charges "as soon as next year".

On 12 June 2015, King Felipe VI officially deprived his sister of her dukedom, privately announcing his intention beforehand. Pursuant to their meeting in person on 12 June Infanta Cristina wrote to the king (her brother) requesting the forfeiture of her noble title, immediately following which a royal decree to that effect was issued. According to newspaper El País, between 1995 and 2013 the Spanish monarchy's approval rating dropped from 7.5 to 3.68 out of 10 amongst Spaniards. The Spanish media also attributed, in no small part, King Juan Carlos' abdication to these ongoing proceedings. Her right of succession to the throne and to the royal title of infanta were unaffected.

Cristina's trial began on 11 January 2016, presided over by three judges in Palma, with a maximum potential sentence of eight years if found guilty. The charges were filed by the 'Clean Hands' anti-graft organisation using a Spanish legal instrument known as the 'people's accusation'. At that time, her lawyers had asked judges to drop the criminal charges against her, and the state prosecutor said there was insufficient evidence to back up the accusations, but on 29 January the Court in Palma de Mallorca, where the trial was being held, said in a statement it was upholding the charges. She took the stand in March 2016, denying being an accessory to tax evasion, and denying knowledge of her husband's activities. She insisted on her right to answer only questions from her own lawyer. She said that her husband handled the couple's finances, and that she did not know why some large personal expenses were charged to a credit card of a company that the couple owned. She said that she never spoke with her husband about these matters because she was not interested in the subject, and that she was very busy with her small children. On 17 February 2017, she was acquitted of the charges, while her husband received a sentence of imprisonment for a term of six years and three months. On 12 June 2018 the Supreme Court in appeal reduced this sentence to a term of five years and ten months.

Titles, styles, honours and arms

Titles and styles
As a child of a Spanish monarch, Cristina is entitled to the designation and rank of infanta with the style of Royal Highness. On the occasion of her marriage in 1997, she was also created Duchess of Palma de Mallorca. She lost the dukedom in 2015 following her husband's alleged involvement in a corruption scandal.

 Her style and title in shorthand: Her Royal Highness Infanta Cristina of Spain.
 Her style and title in full: Her Royal Highness Doña  Cristina Federica Victoria Antonia de la Santísima Trinidad de Borbón y Grecia, Infanta of Spain''.

Honours

National honours
 : Dame Grand Cross of the Order of Charles III
 : Dame Grand Cross of the Order of Isabella the Catholic

Foreign honours
 : Grand Star of the Decoration of Honour for Services to the Republic of Austria
 : Grand Cordon of the Order of Leopold
 : Grand Cross of the National Order of Merit
 : Member Supreme Class of the Order of the Virtues
 : Grand Cross with Silver Star of the Order of José Matías Delgado
 : Grand Cross 1st class of the Order of Merit of the Federal Republic of Germany
 : Grand Cross of the Order of Honour
 : Grand Cross of the Order of the Quetzal
 : Grand Cross of the Order of the Falcon
 : Grand Cordon (Paulownia) of the Order of the Precious Crown
 : Grand Cordon of the Order of the Star of Jordan
 : Grand Cross of the Order of Adolphe of Nassau
 : Grand Cross of the Order of the Aztec Eagle
  Nepalese Royal Family: Member First Class of the Most Illustrious Order of the Three Divine Powers
 : Knight Grand Cross of the Order of Orange-Nassau
 : Grand Cross of the Order of St. Olav
 : Grand Cross of the Order of the Sun
 : Grand Cross of the Order of Christ
 : Grand Cross of the Order of Prince Henry
 : Recipient of the 50th Birthday Badge Medal of King Carl XVI Gustaf
 : Knight Grand Cross of the Order of the White Elephant

Ancestry

See also
Line of succession to the Spanish throne

References

External links

 Royal Household of HM the King official website 

1965 births
Living people
Spanish infantas
Daughters of kings
House of Bourbon (Spain)
Complutense University of Madrid alumni
Dukes of Palma de Mallorca
Sailors at the 1988 Summer Olympics – Tornado
Olympic sailors of Spain
Spanish female sailors (sport)
Nobility from Madrid
Spanish expatriates in Switzerland

Knights Grand Cross of the Order of Isabella the Catholic

Grand Cordons of the Order of the Precious Crown
Grand Crosses of the Order of Christ (Portugal)
Grand Crosses of the Order of Honour (Greece)
Grand Crosses of the Order of Prince Henry
Grand Crosses of the Order of the Quetzal
Knights Grand Cross of the Order of the Falcon
Knights Grand Cross of the Order of Orange-Nassau
Members of the Order of Tri Shakti Patta, First Class
Grand Crosses of the Order of José Matías Delgado
Grand Crosses of the Order of the Sun of Peru